Aghione is a commune in the Haute-Corse department of France on the island of Corsica.

The inhabitants of the commune are known as Aghionais or Aghionaises

Geography

Aghion is located on the eastern plains of Corsica 5 km west of Aleria. From the D343 the D443 branches north at the hamlet of Samuleto and continues to the village before continuing north by a tortuous mountain route to Casevecchie.

The commune is watered by the Tagnone, a tributary of Tavignano that separates an area of hills to the north from the plain, which is larger in area, to the south. There is a large dam with a large lake in the south of the commune.

Neighbouring communes and villages

History
During the Second World War Aghione aerodrome was used by the 306th Fighter Wing of the 15th US Air Force from 10–21 August 1944 to support Operation Dragoon (the Invasion of Southern France).

Administration

List of Successive Mayors of Aghione

Population

Economy
The commune of Aghione is predominantly agricultural. The hills are used for grazing goats, sheep, and pigs; while the plain is planted with vines and fruit trees (kiwifruit, Mandarins). There is no farm of significant size located in the commune. In particular the grapes are collected by neighbouring wineries - mainly by the Aleria cooperative.

There are no longer any trades or services in the commune. The people find everything necessary at Aleria (10 km away) or Ghisonaccia (20 km away).

The commune has no access to the sea yet is close by (Alzitone is 5 kilometres from the coast). Aghione has no tourist facilities and does not have any second homes.

Sites and Monuments

The Sulphurous water source of Puzzichello (site now abandoned)
Alzitone Reservoir (artificial lake)
An old railway line on the eastern plain

See also
Communes of the Haute-Corse department

References

External links
Official website of Aghione 
Aghione on Géoportail, National Geographic Institute (IGN) website 

Communes of Haute-Corse